, also known by the pseudonyms Tycoon To$h or Typhoom Tosh, was a Japanese musician and graphic designer who was best known as the founding member of new wave band Plastics in 1976. He was initially a part of the technopop fever in Japan and later acted as a pioneer of the Japanese hip hop scene with his band Major Force.

Personal life
He was formerly married to Japanese stylist and bandmate Chica Sato of Plastics and Melon. In September 2016, Nakanishi was diagnosed with esophageal cancer. He died on February 25, 2017.

Discography

Solo albums
 GORGEOUS GIRLS (1990)
 ユーリ ORIGINAL SOUND TRACK (1996)

Albums with K.U.D.O
 THE 1st KISS (as Sexy T.K.O.)(1991)
 SANDII:COME AGAIN (1991)
 SANDII:JOGET TO THE BEAT (1991)
 EP (as Love T.K.O.) (1993)
 HEAD TURNER (as Love T.K.O.) (1994)
 Monday Michiru: Maden Japan (as Love T.K.O.) (1994)

Other albums
 The Clap Heads, Snakeman Show (1980)
 (Natural Calamity), DOWN IN THE VALLEY (1991)
 (Natural Calamity), LET IT COME DOWN (1992) 
 (Natural Calamity), NEAR MOUNTAIN (1992)	 
 Group of Gods, GROUP OF GOD (1992)	
 (Tamap Iijima), DASK 'TIL DAWN (1992)
 (高木完), Grass Roots (1992)
 (Natural Calamity), SUN DANCE (1994)

References

Further reading

External links 
 Toshio Nakanishi Discography

1956 births
2017 deaths
Japanese graphic designers
Musicians from Tokyo

Deaths from cancer in Japan
Deaths from esophageal cancer